The 2021 GT World Challenge Europe Sprint Cup Zandvoort round was a motor racing event for the GT World Challenge Europe Sprint Cup, held on the weekend of 18 to 20 June 2021. The event was held at Circuit Zandvoort in Zandvoort, North Holland, the Netherlands and consisted of two races, both one hour in length. It was the second event in the 2021 GT World Challenge Europe Sprint Cup and hosted Races 3 and 4 of the season.

Results

Race 1

Qualifying

Race

Race 2

Qualifying

Race

References

External links
Official website
Race 1 replay
Race 2 replay

|- style="text-align:center"
|width="35%"|Previous race:
|width="30%"|GT World Challenge Europe Sprint Cup2021 season
|width="40%"|Next race:

GT World Challenge Europe Sprint Cup Zandvoort round
GT World Challenge Europe Sprint Cup Zandvoort round